The 2007 Jigawa State gubernatorial election was the 4th gubernatorial election of Jigawa State. Held on April 14, 2007, the People's Democratic Party nominee Sule Lamido won the election, defeating Mohammed Ibrahim of the All Nigeria Peoples Party.

Results 
Sule Lamido from the People's Democratic Party won the election, defeating Mohammed Ibrahim from the All Nigeria Peoples Party. Registered voters was 1,722,352.

References 

Jigawa State gubernatorial elections
Jigawa gubernatorial
April 2007 events in Nigeria